Armando Herrera Montoya (6 January 1931 – 14 October 2020) was a Mexican basketball player. He competed in the men's tournament at the 1960 Summer Olympics and the 1964 Summer Olympics.

Armando Herrera died on 14 October 2020 at the age of 84.

References

External links

1931 births
2020 deaths
Mexican men's basketball players
1959 FIBA World Championship players
Olympic basketball players of Mexico
Basketball players at the 1960 Summer Olympics
Basketball players at the 1964 Summer Olympics
People from Chihuahua City
Basketball players from Chihuahua